Xocamusaxlı or Khodzhamusakhly or Khodzham Sagly may refer to:
Aşağı Xocamusaxlı, Azerbaijan
Yuxarı Xocamusaxlı, Azerbaijan